Halton—Peel was a federal electoral district represented in the House of Commons of Canada from 1988 to 1997. It was located in the province of Ontario. This riding was created in 1987 from parts of Brampton—Georgetown, Halton and York—Peel ridings.

It consisted of the northern part of the City of Burlington, the Town of Halton Hills, the part of the Town of Milton lying between Tremaine Road and the Macdonald-Cartier Freeway, and the Town of Caledon.

The electoral district was abolished in 1996 when it was re-distributed between Burlington, Dufferin—Peel—Wellington—Grey, and Halton ridings.

Members of Parliament

Electoral history

See also 

 List of Canadian federal electoral districts
 Past Canadian electoral districts

External links 
Riding history from the Library of Parliament

Former federal electoral districts of Ontario
Halton Hills
Milton, Ontario
Politics of Burlington, Ontario